USS Cannon (DE-99) was a destroyer escort launched on 25 May 1943 by the Dravo Corporation in Wilmington, Delaware and was sponsored by Mrs. E. H. Cannon. Cannon was commissioned on 26 September 1943 and reported to the United States Atlantic Fleet. The ship was named in honor of George H. Cannon, a Medal of Honor recipient.

Service history
On 30 November 1943, Cannon cleared Philadelphia for Trinidad, where she arrived on 5 December to begin a year of duty escorting convoys from that oil rich island to Recife and Rio de Janeiro, Brazil. During this time, she made one voyage from Brazil to Gibraltar, guarding convoys whose tankers carried the fuel essential to the operations in the Mediterranean.

Cannons protection of the Allied fuel supply through the sea lanes of the Caribbean and the Atlantic Narrows ended on 4 December 1944, when she arrived at Natal, Brazil to begin training a Brazilian crew in the operation of the ship. Cannon was decommissioned and transferred to Brazil on 19 December 1944 at Natal. She continued to serve in the Brazilian Navy as Baependi until 1975.

Awards

References

External links
NavSource.org – DE-99

Cannon-class destroyer escorts of the United States Navy
Ships built in Wilmington, Delaware
1943 ships
World War II frigates and destroyer escorts of the United States
Bertioga-class destroyer escorts
Cannon-class destroyer escorts of the Brazilian Navy
World War II frigates of Brazil
Ships built by Dravo Corporation